Flaviac is a commune in the Ardèche department in southern France.

Population

International relations
Flaviac is twinned with:
 Bistagno, Italy
 Spinone al Lago, Italy

See also
Communes of the Ardèche department

References

Communes of Ardèche
Ardèche communes articles needing translation from French Wikipedia